The men's 3-metre synchro springboard event at the 2015 European Diving Championships was won by the Russian team of Evgeny Kuznetsov and Ilya Zakharov. Nine teams took part in the finals.

Medalists

Results

Green denotes finalists

2015 European Diving Championships